Gruppe 33 (English: Group 33) was an anti-fascist collective of Swiss artists founded in Basel.

History 
“Group 33” was founded on the same day Nazis began burning books en masse, 10 May 1933. It was formed by 15 artists out of a shared political ideology in conjunction with a growing resistance to Nazi influence in the border town of Basel. The members also opposed the dominance of older conservative artists who controlled the Society of Swiss Painters, Sculptors, and Architects (German: Gesellschaft Schweizerischer Maler, Bildhauer und Architekten, or GSMBA).

The collective was mostly made up of artists and architects from many different disciplines, but also included poets, musicians, actors, and writers. Their work was varied in expression as well as medium, incorporating avant-garde, surrealism, constructivism, and New Objectivity.

Over the course of several decades, 38 artists came to be associated with Gruppe 33. It continued to serve as a network emerging expressions and artistic movements. The group was officially dissolved in 1970. In 1983, a retrospective of the group’s work was held at the Kunsthalle Basel.

Founding members 

 Otto Abt, painter
 Paul Artaria, architect
 Walter Bodmer, painter and sculptor
 Paul Camenisch, painter
 Theo Eble, painter
 Max Haufler, painter, actor, and director
 Charles Hindenlang, painter
 Daniel Hummel, painter and sculptor
 Carlo König, painter
 Rudolf Maeglin, painter
 Ernst Max Musfeld, painter
 Otto Staiger, painter
 Max Sulzbachner, painter
 Louis Weber, painter
 Walter Kurt Wiemken, painter

Further members 

 Meret Oppenheim, artist
 Kurt Seligmann, painter

References 

Anti-fascism in Switzerland
Arts organizations established in 1933
Organisations based in Basel
1933 establishments in Switzerland
Central European art groups